A trope in modern fantasy/science fiction is the idea of a central language (often called The Speech) that is the root of all languages, and in some cases the true describing words that made the universe.

Examples
Unifying characteristics of this language in many books include:
 allowing comprehension of all other languages, including those of animals
 a medium for magic
 a mode of communication for a high class of people
 difficult or impossible to lie in

A popular example of this is found in the Young Wizards series of novels by Diane Duane.  All creatures and things understand and, to a degree, can speak the Speech intuitively, but specifically, it is the wizards who use it as their primary language and means of performing their works of magic.  It is incredibly detailed and describes things that other languages cannot.  Describing something inaccurately in the Speech may result in catastrophic effects (including changing the nature of the thing or being therein misdescribed); therefore, wizards are advised to never curse or lie in the Speech.  Spells are described in the Speech; the wizard tells the object/subject what he/she wants to happen to it.  With a final word, the spell can be let loose to do what it was supposed to do.

The written characters of "The Speech" are described in several of the books as resembling Arabic, and in Deep Wizardry, Nita's father mistakes the writing on the title page of Nita's Manual for Arabic letters.

Other examples:
In the Pellinor series by Alison Croggon, the Bards of the land, magic users and Light bringers use the Speech, the ancient bardic language that activates magic.
In Christopher Paolini's Inheritance Cycle, a dead language called the Ancient Language is used for spellcasting and by elves.
In Ursula K. Le Guin's Earthsea series, the True Speech is the language of magic. It is the native language of dragons, but wizards must learn it by study. Humans cannot lie in it, but dragons can. It is known by many names: the Old Speech, the (True) Language/Speech/Words of the Making, True Words, the Eldest tongue, the Dragon tongue, spellwords.

See also

 True name

References

Young Wizards
Fictional languages